Papín is a village and municipality in Humenné District in the Prešov Region of north-east Slovakia.

History

Geography

References

External links
 
https://web.archive.org/web/20070927201701/http://www.statistics.sk/mosmis/eng/prvav2.jsp?txtUroven=440702&lstObec=520624&Okruh=zaklad

Villages and municipalities in Humenné District